Ward Hill is a neighborhood in Haverhill, Essex County, Massachusetts. It is bordered on the northeast and west by the Merrimack River. Main roads include the Massachusetts Route 125 called South Main Street where it passes through, the Connector road to I-495 exit 48 and I-495 where it is called the Blue Star Memorial Highway.

It also has a hill called Ward Hill and an island called Kimball Island on the river bank on the west.

Other places in this neighborhood include the Whittier Rehabilitation Hospital.

References

Haverhill, Massachusetts
Neighborhoods in Massachusetts
Populated places in Essex County, Massachusetts